Wuliangshan is a town in Nanjian Yi Autonomous County, Yunnan, China. It is known as "Hometown of Tea" in Yunnan.

Administrative division
As of 2018, the town is divided into thirteen villages: 
 Guangming
 Baoping
 De'an
 Xinzheng
 Gude
 Majie
 Kebao
 Weiguo
 Hongxing
 Fada
 Baotai
 Heping
 Huashan

Geography
The town is situated at southeastern Nanjian Yi Autonomous County. It is surrounded by Baohua Town on the north, Gonglang Town on the west, Midu County on the east, and Jingdong Yi Autonomous County on the south.

Economy
The region's economy is based on agriculture, tourism, and forestry. Tea, tobacco, Juglans sigillata, bean are the economic plants of this region. The region abounds with copper, iron, lead, coal and zinc.

Demographics

As of 2020, the National Bureau of Statistics of China estimates the town's population now to be 37,063.

Tourist attractions
The Lingbaoshan National Forest Park is located in the town.

Transportation
The town is crossed by the National Highway G214 and the Xiao-Pu Provincial Highway.

References

Bibliography

Divisions of Nanjian Yi Autonomous County